The Manhattan Brewing Company was a brewery founded in Chicago, United States in 1893 which had associations with Al Capone and organized crime during and after prohibition. Manhattan later changed its name to the Canadian Ace Brewing Company and operated as such through the 1950s and 1960s until closing in 1968.

History 
The Manhattan Brewing Co. was founded in 1893.

According to the book After Capone, Chicago mobster Johnny Torrio and partner veteran brewing magnate Joseph Stenson (of Stenson Brewing Company) purchased Manhattan in 1919. Not long after the purchase, pal Louis Greenberg (finance man for Al Capone) assumed management responsibilities and held a significant stock position in the brewery. Greenberg was seen as a perfect fit given his experience in the booze businesses and as a money-man.

During Prohibition, Torrio, Greenberg and other underworld elements reorganized the brewery under the Malt Maid name and in 1925 the name was changed to Fort Dearborn Products Company. Beer was produced illegally on the premises, and the brewery was occasionally searched.

In 1932, with pal Greenberg's help, Chicago mob boss Frank Nitti, purchased the brewery. Manhattan returned to regular beer production after prohibition was repealed. In 1933, likely in anticipation of legal 3.2% beer, the name was changed from Fort Dearborn to back to Manhattan.

Up to January, 1936, Manhattan Brewery confined its distribution to the states immediately adjacent to its locale. During that period, "Old Manhattan" was their flagship brand. With the advent of the Keglined beer can, Manhattan dramatically expanded their distribution and brand offerings.
In 1938, Manhattan boasted of being second to the Pabst Brewing Company in canned beer production.

Manhattan had business relationships with many brewing companies. Manhattan records indicate they owned stock in the Prima-Bismarck brewing company, and advanced cash to a number of brewing companies (Food City, Whitewater, Ann Arbor). Manhattan would can and bottle brands under contract for such breweries.

According to After Capone, when Nitti committed suicide in 1943, he owned 85 percent of the stock in Manhattan and also owned an interest in the Prima-Bismark brewing company.

The Manhattan brewery was demolished in 1976.

Organized Crime 
Individuals with ties to organized crime had both direct and indirect involvement with the operations of Manhattan. During prohibition, Johnny Torrio was the primary owner, and later Al Capone was associated with illicit activities at the brewery during the Malt Maid Products / Fort Dearborn Products era. During and after the Prohibition era, Lou Greenberg (finance man for Al Capone) was a primary owner and manager of Manhattan. In April, 1933 respectable Arthur Lueder was installed as President.

According to the book After Capone, when Frank Nitti committed suicide in 1943, he owned 85 percent of the stock in Manhattan and also owned an interest in the Prima-Bismark brewing company.

Manhattan had run-ins with federal authorities, mainly for deceptive marketing practices which often suggested beer produced at their brewery in Chicago was produced by different breweries, or in different locations. The ANNUAL REPORT OF THE FEDERAL TRADE COMMISSION FOR THE FISCAL YEAR ENDED JUNE 30 1944 mentions the following case pending in the courts:  "Manhattan Brewing Co., Chicago.--Seventh Circuit (Chicago), misleading use of words "Canadian" and "Wisconsin" in brand or trade names for beer or ale not brewed in Canada or Wisconsin." The Canadian (Ace) issue drags on through 1945 and 1946.

Manhattan was also known to pressure the Chicago bartenders union to push Manhattan products.

Athletic sponsorship
The brewery sponsored the Chicago Manhattan Beer soccer team, one of the top midwest teams in the early twentieth century.  Such great players as Fabri Salcedo and Billy Gonsalves spent time with the team which won the 1938 Peel Cup and finished runner up in the 1939 National Challenge Cup.

Breweriana 
Besides the link with organized crime, interest in the Manhattan Brewing Company is due to the variety of brands and related breweriana for which they were directly or indirectly responsible. Cans are sought after Manhattan breweriana including the most desired beer can by collectors in existence is that of what was called Tiger Beer. There is only one known example and it is the Holy Grail of collectable beer cans. Although company records indicate many cases were shipped , only one example was ever found

Canadian Ace Brewing Company 
Manhattan changed their name to Canadian Ace effective January 2, 1947, and discontinued producing any brands bearing Manhattan in the name. The likely rational was an attempt "clean-up" the post-war image of the brewery by retiring the Manhattan flagship brand and relying upon the well established Canadian Ace brand to be the bellwether for the future.

The link to organized crime remained as Lou Greenberg was a principal owner of the Canadian Ace Brewing Company.

As Canadian Ace, the brewery used various brewery names on their cans matching the label or brand (Essex was Essex Brewery Ltd., Jester was the Jester Brewing Co., and so on. The Canadian Ace produced brewery closed in 1968.

References 

The Great Chicago Beer Cans, by Phil Pospychala & Joe McFarland, copyright 1979 by SILVER FOX PRODUCTIONS.
Capone and Manhattan: The Myth Persists, by Rich LaSusa, The Breweriana Collector, a publication of the National Association Brewreiana Advertising, volume 130.
After Capone: The Life And World Of Chicago Mob Boss Frank "the Enforcer" Nitti by Mars Eghigian Jr. Cumberland House Publishing (February 13, 2006)

History of Chicago
Manufacturing companies based in Chicago